Dennis Fadeski is a retired American soccer defender who played professionally in the USL A-League.

Fadeski graduated from Brooksfield East High School where he was a two-sport athlete – soccer and wrestling.  Fadeski won the state wrestling title his senior season and was part of the undefeated 1995 high school state championship soccer team.  Fadeski attended Indiana University, playing for the men’s soccer team from 1996 to 1999.  In 1998 and 1999, the Hoosiers won the NCAA Division I Men's Soccer Championship.  In 1998 and 1999, he also played for the Wisconsin Rebels of the USL Premier Development League.  In February 2000, the Milwaukee Rampage selected Fadeski in the Territorial Round of the 2000 A-League Draft.  Fadeski spent four seasons with the Rampage.  When the Rampage ceased operations in 2003, Fadeski moved to the Milwaukee Wave United for the 2004 season.

References

Living people
1977 births
American soccer players
Indiana Hoosiers men's soccer players
Milwaukee Rampage players
Milwaukee Wave United players
People from Brookfield, Wisconsin
Soccer players from Wisconsin
A-League (1995–2004) players
USL League Two players
Wisconsin Rebels players
Sportspeople from the Milwaukee metropolitan area
Association football defenders